Brown & Hawkins is a general store in Seward, Alaska. It was founded in 1904 to serve the town and those constructing of the Alaska Central Railroad, and has been the oldest continuously operating business in Seward.  It was listed on the National Register of Historic Places in 1988. It was announced in 2013 that the owners were retiring without finding anyone to buy their business.

Brown & Hawkins was a business venture between partners Charles E. Brown of Montreal, Quebec, Canada and T.W. Hawkins of Roanoke, Virginia. The two men met in Nome during the Gold Rush. They first started business together in Valdez in 1900 before moving to Seward in 1903. Their business in Seward included a store and bank.

The store building began as a one-story  frontier store with a low false front in 1903.  It evolved through four periods of construction to add and modify additional structures.

As of 2009 Brown & Hawkins was still owned by the Hawkins family, making it the oldest store in Alaska under the same ownership. The original Mosler safe and brass cash register were displayed in the store.

On June 4, 2019, Brown & Hawkins Building was sold to Jeffrey and Michelle Cobble. 

“The sale of the building is really big news. According to First American Title, it is the last parcel of land that has remained with the family of one of Seward’s founding fathers to be title transferred.

Although we have had several persons interested in this Historic Property on the National Register this is the first Buyers we have felt comfortable with being good custodians for this Brown and Hawkins historic treasure.  

The Buyer is an architect who appreciates heritage and both he and his wife are professional wildlife and outdoor photographers who desire to establish a very special Cobble-Art Gallery on sight.

So, needless to say, we handpicked these buyers to end this era of Brown & Hawkins in Seward and to move forward with our love for Seward with people who care as much as we do for this wonderful town and residents.

Our four generations of Darlings were on hand this week to share this special time with us.” - Iris Darling

See also
 National Register of Historic Places listings in Kenai Peninsula Borough, Alaska

References

External links
 

1904 establishments in Alaska
Commercial buildings completed in 1904
Commercial buildings on the National Register of Historic Places in Alaska
Buildings and structures on the National Register of Historic Places in Kenai Peninsula Borough, Alaska
Retail buildings in Alaska
Buildings and structures in Seward, Alaska